Stephen K. Baskerville (born October 15, 1957) is an American scholar of political science. He is described by Paul Craig Roberts as a leading authority on divorce, child custody and the family court system.

Education and employment 
Baskerville holds a BA in International Relations from American University as well as a PhD in Political Science and History from the London School of Economics and Political Science.  

Baskerville was a Professor of Government and Director of the International Politics & Policy program at Patrick Henry College. He was previously Professor of Political Science at Howard University. He is the managing editor of the International Journal for Religious Freedom.

In 1996 Baskerville published Not Peace but a Sword, dealing with the "political theology" of the English Civil War era, which was described by one review as "comprehensive."

Families and fathers

Baskerville has served as the president of the American Coalition of Fathers and Children, and has been featured as a guest on The Political Cesspool.

Human Events described Baskerville as both critiquing the ways the systems create individual crimes and arguing that they create patronage systems and function at times to perpetuate the high levels of divorce that require the current large staffs in the system.  It describes Baskerville's speciality as studying how public policy affects the family and working as an activist to change the policy.  Baskerville's book Taken Into Custody: The War Against Fatherhood, Marriage and the Family (Cumberland House Publishing, 2007) was described by Touchstone Magazine as possibly his biggest contribution to public policy debates.

For Baskerville, a.o. LGBT rights are part of an ideological "sexual agenda", which is - in his view - "the greatest threat to religious freedom – and therefore to freedom generally – in the Western world today".

References

External links
Professor Baskerville's testimony to the National Press Club in August 2007
O'Reilly Factor interview with Baskerville
Mass News interview between Baskerview and Women's Freedom Network

Alumni of the London School of Economics
American political scientists
American University School of International Service alumni
Fathers' rights activists
1957 births
Living people
Howard University faculty
Patrick Henry College faculty